Julien Le Devedec (born 6 June 1986 in Sainte-Foy-la-Grande, France) is a French rugby union footballer, currently playing for Provence Rugby in the Pro D2. His usual position is at Lock or Number 8. Prior to joining CA Brive he played for Stade Toulousain where he won the 2007-08 Top 14 and the 2004-05 Heineken Cup and the 2009-10 Heineken Cup.

Honours 
 Top 14, 2008 with Stade Toulousain
 Heineken Cup, 2005 and 2010 with Stade Toulousain

External links
ERC stats

1986 births
Living people
French rugby union players
Stade Toulousain players
CA Brive players
French people of Breton descent
France international rugby union players
Rugby union locks